Meldrim may refer to:

Meldrim, Georgia, United States
Green-Meldrim House, historical building located in Savannah, Georgia
Meldrim, Georgia trestle disaster occurred at Meldrim, Georgia on June 28, 1959
Meldrim Thomson, Jr. (1912–2001), Republican who served three terms as Governor of the U.S. state of New Hampshire
Peter Meldrim, politician, a judge and an army officer from Georgia, USA